Trisha Covington (born in Cleveland, Ohio) is an American R&B singer who scored a top 40 R&B hit in 1994 in the U.S. "Why You Wanna Play Me Out?" Covington was signed to Columbia Records from 1994 to 1998. Her follow-up single, "Slow Down," produced by Marc Nelson and Kyle West, was released in 1995, and reached No. 79 in the US. That year also saw the release of her debut album, Call Me.

In 2008, she appeared on Randy Jackson's compilation album Randy Jackson's Music Club, Volume One, on the song "What Am I So Afraid Of" with Keke Wyatt and Kiley Dean.

As of 2011, she is currently working on a new album with two recently released songs, "Good Together" and "Broken Record." She has recently gone on tour to Africa with Jermaine Jackson and is appearing in various shows.

Singles

References 

Living people
Year of birth missing (living people)
Musicians from Cleveland